The 1965–66 Texas Western Miners basketball team represented Texas Western College, now the University of Texas at El Paso (UTEP), led by Hall of Fame head coach Don Haskins. The team won the national championship in 1966, becoming the first team with an all-black starting lineup to do so. The Miners only lost one game, a road loss to Seattle by two points. They won their games by an average of 15.2 points.

The Miners beat Kentucky (an all-white program until 1969) 72–65 in the historic championship game, played on Saturday, March 19, at Cole Field House on the University of Maryland campus in College Park, a suburb of Washington, D.C.

The team was inducted into the Naismith Memorial Basketball Hall of Fame in 2007
 and inspired the book and film Glory Road.

Roster

After the championship
The 1965–66 Texas Western basketball team faced many issues due to racism. For example, when they won the championship no one brought out a ladder for them to cut down the net. Nevil Shed had to hoist up Willie Worsley so he could do the honors. Also, they were not invited on The Ed Sullivan Show, which was customary for the NCAA Champions. Texas Western's (UTEP's) winning the basketball national championship helped promote the desegregation of athletics in the Southeastern Conference which had its first black basketball player in 1967.

Schedule

|-
!colspan=9 style=|Regular Season

|-
!colspan=12 style="background:#;"| NCAA Tournament

References

Further reading
 Fitzpatrick, Frank. And the Walls Came Tumbling Down: The Basketball Game That Changed American Sports (2000)
Haskins, Don with Dan Wetzel. Glory Road: My Story of the 1966 NCAA Basketball Championship and How One Team Triumphed Against the Odds and Changed America Forever. New York:Hyperion, 2006. 254 pp. No index. . 
 Hutchison, Phillip. "The legend of Texas Western: journalism and the epic sports spectacle that wasn’t." Critical Studies in Media Communication 33.2 (2016): 154-167.
 Sanchez,  Ramon. Basketball's Biggest Upset: Texas Western Changed The Sport With A Win Over Kentucky In 1966 (1991) excerpt, game by game details—and play-by-play for championship game.

Texas Western
UTEP Miners men's basketball seasons
NCAA Division I men's basketball tournament championship seasons
NCAA Division I men's basketball tournament Final Four seasons
Texas Western
Naismith Memorial Basketball Hall of Fame inductees